Rivona Constituency was one of the 30 Goa Legislative Assembly constituencies of the state of Goa in southern India. Rivona was also one of the constituencies falling under the South Goa Lok Sabha constituency.

Members of Goa Legislative Assembly

References

Former assembly constituencies of Goa
South Goa district